Wat Bang Kung is an ancient temple in Samut Songkhram, Thailand. It was built in the Ayutthaya period. It was the site of the Battle of Bang Kung between the Konbaung Dynasty and the Thonburi Kingdom.

History 

Since Ayutthaya period in 1765, Burmese troops attacked Ayutthaya. Somdet Phra Chao Yu Hua Phra Thi Nang Suriyat Amarin (King of Ayutthaya) commanded navy encamped and build the wall around Wat Bang Kung in the middle of the camp as a spirit center for soldiers. Burmese troops moved along Maeklong river until they found Bang Kung Camp. The army of Ayutthaya could not resist them. Finally, the camp was destroyed and become abandoned camp.

In 1767, after King Taksin the Great (King of Thonburi) regained the country's independence, he commanded the Chinese from Rayong, Chon Buri, Ratchaburi, and Kanchanaburi to form a guard to protect the camp and called it Bang Kung Chinese Camp.

In 1768, Burmese troops led by Burmese king of Angwa ordered army and navy to besiege Bang Kung Chinese camp again. Chinese troops fought and almost could not resist them until King Taksin the Great found out about the battle. King Taksin the Great and Maha Sura Singhanat jointly fought and defeated the Burmese. This victory affects many aspects including Thailand still being independent nation and gave them great encouragement.

Architecture 
Archaeological evidence currently remains in the Ubosot (Ordination Hall) which was built in the Ayutthaya period. It is covered with roots of four plants are Pho (Bodhi), Sai (Banyan), Krai, and Krang. These roots help the hall to stay stable. It is also called Bot Prok Pho. There is a statue of the Buddha enshrined in the hall commonly called Luang Phot Bot Noi. Inside the hall, there is a mural that shows a story about Buddha. The Fine Arts Department has registered Wat Bang Kung as a national archaeological site on December 18, 1996.

Gallery

Location 
Bang Kung Sub-district, Bang Khontee District, Samut Songkhram.

References

Buddhist temples in Samut Songkhram Province
Tourist attractions in Samut Songkhram province